The National Gay Newspaper Guild is an organization of LGBT newspapers located in the United States.

Through Rivendell Media, the guild gathers statistics on the readership of the member publications.

Member publications
Bay Area Reporter
Bay Windows
Between the Lines
Dallas Voice
Frontiers
Philadelphia Gay News
San Francisco Sentinel
Washington Blade
Windy City Times

References

National Gay Newspaper Guild